The politics of Mexico function within a framework of a federal presidential representative democratic republic whose government is based on a multi-party congressional system , where the President of Mexico is both head of state and head of government. The federal government represents the United Mexican States and is divided into three branches: executive, legislative and judicial, as established by the Political Constitution of the United Mexican States, published in 1917. The constituent states of the federation must also have a republican form of government based on a congressional system as established by their respective constitutions.

The executive power is exercised by the executive branch, which is headed by the President, advised by a cabinet of secretaries that are independent of the legislature. Legislative power is vested upon the Congress of the Union, a two-chamber legislature comprising the Senate of the Republic and the Chamber of Deputies. Judicial power is exercised by the judiciary, consisting of the Supreme Court of Justice of the Nation, the Council of the Federal Judiciary and the collegiate, unitary and district tribunals.

The politics of Mexico are dominated by four political parties: Institutional Revolutionary Party (PRI), National Action Party (PAN), Democratic Revolution Party (PRD), and the National Regeneration Movement (MORENA). Founded in 1929 as the Partido Nacional Revolucionario ("National Revolutionary Party"), PRI has dominated Mexican politics for over 70 years bringing to power 11 different governments. PAN was founded in 1939, but it did not win its first governorship until 1989; its candidates won the presidency in 2000 and 2006. The beginnings of PRD go back to 1988 when dissident members of PRI decided to challenge the leadership and nominated Cuauhtémoc Cárdenas for president of Mexico. Cardenas lost in a highly contested election, but a new political party was born and the party emerged as a third force in Mexican politics, even though they have never captured the presidency. MORENA grew out of a dispute between Andrés Manuel López Obrador and other leaders of PRD after his loss in the 2012 presidential election. MORENA won its official recognition in 2014, and dominated the 2018 elections.

According to a survey by the National Autonomous University of Mexico in 2017, 74 percent of Mexicans believe that Mexico's electoral system is not transparent and distrust official results. However, Freedom House shows that popular belief in free and fair elections has increased ever since.

Framework of twentieth-century politics 
The Mexican Revolution (1910-1920) followed the overturn of Porfirio Díaz's dictatorship and ended with a new Mexican government being established within the legal framework of the Constitution of 1917. The regime that followed can be considered a semi-authoritarian political model (or hybrid regime). In 1920, a successful general in the revolution named Alvaro Obregón overthrew the temporary government of the revolutionary leader Venustiano Carranza, which resulted on his election as the president of Mexico. He was then replaced by Plutarco Elías Calles, who ruled Mexico from 1924 to 1928. After a change in the rules that prevented two mandates by the same person, Obregón came back to power in 1928, but was assassinated shortly after. As a result, out-going president Calles founded a political party, the Partido Nacional Revolucionario (PNR), to solve the immediate political crisis of the assassination and to create a long term framework for political stability, especially the transition of presidential regimes. The period from 1920-1934 in Mexico was marked by a strong presence of military in government and a failure to implement revolutionary reforms.

Under President Lázaro Cárdenas (1934–40), the party underwent a transformation to the Partido de la Revolución Mexicana, which was organized on a corporate basis, with peasants, labor, the popular sector, and the military each having a sector, with power centralized. The PRM aimed to mediate conflicts between competing sectors within the party, becoming an extension of the Mexican state. In 1946, the party was transformed into the Institutional Revolutionary Party (PRI), and the army was no longer a sector. During this time, the government nationalized key industries, such as oil, and implemented land reforms that redistributed property to peasants.

Throughout the second decade of the twentieth century, Mexico experienced political tension and rising economic instability. The late 1960s and early 1970s saw multiple protests from students and left-wing groups against PRI's authoritarian rule, to which the government responded with a crackdown that culminated in the infamous Tlatelolco Massacre of 1968, in which hundreds of protesters were killed. However, the year 1982 gave way to market restructuring policies and gradual political reforms that prompted the democratic transition of Mexico (1982-2012).  The first efforts to introduce free and fair elections came with president Miguel de la Madrid in 1983, but the attempt was unsuccessful as he was opposed by politicians in his own party.

In 1988, when Carlos Salinas de Gortari, a Harvard-trained economist, was chosen as the PRI presidential candidate, Cuauhtémoc Cárdenas, son of former President Lázaro Cárdenas, broke with the PRI and ran as a coalition candidate. The 1988 elections were regarded as "the most fraudulent in Mexico's history. In 1989 the leftists who had bolted the PRI formed the Party of the Democratic Revolution. In the wake of the fraudulent 1988 elections, the administration of elections was taken out of the hands of the Mexican government's Ministry of the Interior (Gobernación) and the Instituto Federal Electoral (IFE) was created in 1990, with the aim of ensuring free and fair elections and creating public confidence in the process. Besides greater political representation, Carlos Salinas's mandate (1988–1994) also saw economic improvements due to liberalization policies, facilitating the process of democratization.

Political parties 

Constitutionally, political parties in Mexico must promote the participation of the people in the democratic life of the country, contribute in the representation of the nation and citizens, and be the access through which citizens can participate in public office, through whatever programs, principles and ideals they postulate. All political parties must be registered with the National Electoral Institute (INE), the institution in charge of organizing and overseeing the federal electoral processes, and must obtain at least 2% of votes in the federal elections to keep their registry. Registered political parties receive public funding for their operation and can also obtain private funding within the limits prescribed by the law.
As of 2010 the following political parties are registered with the INE and all have representatives at the Congress of the Union:
 Institutional Revolutionary Party (PRI), founded in 1929;
 National Action Party (PAN), founded in 1939;
 Party of the Democratic Revolution (PRD), founded in 1989;
 Labor Party (PT), founded in 1990;
 Green Ecological Party (PVEM), founded in 1986, but lost its registration for two consecutive elections; it has retained its registration since 1993;
 Citizens’ Movement (MC), founded in 1997;
 National Regeneration Movement, founded in 2012;

Political parties are allowed to form alliances or coalitions to nominate candidates for any particular election. The coalition must identify itself with a particular name and logo. Proportional representation (plurinominal) seats are assigned to the coalition based on the percentage of votes obtained in the elections, and then the coalition reassigns them to the constituent political parties. Once each party in the coalition has been assigned plurinominal seats, they do not necessarily continue to work as a coalition in government.

Throughout the 20th century, PRI had an almost hegemonic power at the state and federal level, which slowly began to recede in the late 1980s. Even though since the 1940s, PAN had won a couple of seats in the Congress, and in 1947 the first presidential municipality (in ), it wasn't until 1989, that the first non-PRI state governor was elected (in ). It was in 1997, that PRI lost its absolute majority at the Congress of the Union. In 2000 the first non-PRI president since 1929 was elected in what was regarded as the cleanest Mexican election since the end of the Mexican Revolution in 1920.

Elections and political composition of the institutions

Suffrage is universal, free, secret and direct for all Mexican citizens 18 and older, and is compulsory (but not enforced). The identity document in Mexico serves also as the voting card, so all citizens are automatically registered for all elections; that is, no pre-registration is necessary for every election. All elections are direct; that is, no electoral college is constituted for any of the elections at the federal, state or municipal level. Only when an incumbent president is absolutely absent (either through resignation, impeachment or death), the Congress of the Union constitutes itself acts as an electoral college to elect an interim president by absolute majority.

Presidential elections are scheduled every six years, except in the exceptional case of absolute absence of the president. However, the term of the current president, Andrés Manuel López Obrador, will be only 5 years, 10 months (December 1, 2018 — September 30, 2024) due to a Constitutional change. Legislative elections are scheduled every six years for the Senate, to be fully renewed in elections held concurrently with the presidential elections; and every three years for the Chamber of Deputies. Elections have traditionally been held on the first Sunday of July, but the new law means they will be held on the first Sunday in June instead. State governors are also elected every six years, except in Baja California, where the governor is elected for a two-year term. The state legislatures are renewed every three years. State elections need not be concurrent with federal elections. Federal elections are organized and supervised by the autonomous public Federal Electoral Institute, whereas state and municipal elections are organized and supervised by electoral institutes constituted by each state of the federation. Elections within Mexico City are also organized by a local electoral institute.

A strongly ingrained concept in Mexican political life is "no reelection."  The theory was implemented after Porfirio Díaz managed to monopolize the presidency for over 25 years.  Presently, Mexican presidents are limited to a single six-year term, and no one who has held the office even on a caretaker basis is allowed to hold the office again.  Deputies and senators were not allowed to immediately succeed themselves until 2018; both may now serve a maximum  of  12 consecutive years.

Federal elections

2006 

Federal presidential elections were held on July 2, 2006 concurrent with the full renovation of both chambers of the Congress of the Union. In these elections the Party of the Democratic Revolution (PRD), the Labour Party (PT) and Convergence (CV) formed a coalition called Coalition for the Good of All. The Institutional Revolutionary Party (PRI) and the Ecologist Green Party (PVEM) formed a coalition called Alliance for Mexico. The Federal Electoral Tribunal declared Felipe Calderón the winner of the elections on September 5, and president-elect. He took office on December 1, 2006 and his term ended on November 30, 2012. The concurrent congressional elections were not contested by any party. Both chambers were completely renewed and no party obtained an absolute majority. This election has been noted by scholars, including Mexican sociologist Jacqueline Peschard, for the "breakdown in consensus that nearly resulted" as a result of the ensuing indeterminacy and the problems that has posed for Mexican democracy.

2012 

In 2012, Mexico elected Enrique Peña Nieto as President.

2018 

In 2018, Mexico elected Andrés Manuel López Obrador as President. He ran under a three-party coalition led by the leftist National Regeneration Movement party (Morena) he founded in 2014.

State elections

The elections in each state are done at different times, depending on the state, and are not necessarily held at the same time with the federal elections. as of June 2021
 PRI governs 4 states : Coahuila, Hidalgo,  Mexico, Oaxaca,
 PAN governs 8 states: Aguascalientes, Chihuahua, Durango, Guanajuato, Querétaro, Quintana Roo, Tamaulipas and Yucatan
 PVEM governs a state: San Luis Potosi
 MC governs 2 states: Jalisco and Nuevo Leon
Morena governs the remaining 17 states

Historical political development

The Mexican Revolution was followed by the Great Depression, which led to a severely fragmented society and very weak institutions. In 1929, all factions and generals of the Mexican Revolution were united into a single party, the National Revolutionary Party (NRP), with the aim of stabilizing the country and ending internal conflicts. During the following administrations, since 1928, many of the revolutionary ideals were put into effect, among them the free distribution of land to peasants and farmers, the nationalization of the oil companies, the birth and rapid growth of the Social Security Institute as well as that of Labor Unions, and the protection of national industries.

President Lázaro Cárdenas was fundamental to recover some of the social control that was lost during the Revolution and the following economic meltdown in the United States. However, Cárdenas was followed by a series of less-talented leaders that were unable to continue this path and establish an effective rule of law on Mexican society. Moreover, Cárdenas presidency happened before the UN focused on states as the rule in the 1940s and 1950s.

The NRP was later renamed the Mexican Revolution Party and finally the Institutional Revolutionary Party. The social institutions created by the party itself provided it with the necessary strength to stay in power. In time, the system gradually became, as some political scientists have labeled it, an "electoral authoritarianism", in that the party resorted to any means necessary, except that of the dissolution of the constitutional and electoral system itself, to remain in power. In fact, Mexico was considered a bastion of continued constitutional government in times where coup d'états and military dictatorships were the norm in Latin America, in that the institutions were renovated electorally, even if only in appearance and with little participation of the opposition parties at the local level.

The lack of the establishment of a true democracy in Mexico can be partially explained many factors, like the ones described above. However, one of them could also be the oil reserves that exist in the country and that were nationalized by the Cárdenas government. Several empirical studies point to a correlation between the existence of natural resources and the difficulty of turning into a democracy.

The first cracks in the system, even though they were merely symbolic, were the 1970s reforms to the electoral system and the composition of the Congress of the Union which for the first time incorporated proportional representation seats allowing opposition parties to obtain seats, though limited in number, in the Chamber of Deputies. As minority parties became involved in the system, they gradually demanded more changes, and a full democratic representation. Even though in the 1960s, a couple (of more than two thousand) municipalities were governed by opposition parties, the first state government to be won by an opposition party was Baja California, in 1989.

Historically, there were important high-profile defections from the Institutional Revolutionary Party, like the ones of Juan Andreu Almazán (1940), Ezequiel Padilla (1946), Miguel Henríquez Guzmán (1952), and Cuahtémoc Cárdenas (1988), son of President Lázaro Cárdenas. These departures happened mainly because they opposed the presidential candidate nominations; however, only Cárdenas departure in 1988 resulted in the establishment of another political party (Party of the Democratic Revolution).

The presidential elections held in 1988 marked a watershed in Mexican politics, as they were the first serious threat to the party in power by an opposition candidate: Cuauhtémoc Cárdenas, who was nominated by a broad coalition of leftist parties. He officially received 31.1 percent of the vote, against 50.4 percent for Carlos Salinas de Gortari, the PRI candidate, and 17 percent for Manuel Clouthier of the National Action Party (PAN). It was believed by some that Cardenas had won the election, but that the then government-controlled electoral commission had altered the results after the infamous "the system crashed" (se cayó el sistema, as it was reported). In the concurrent elections, the PRI came within 11 seats of losing the majority of Chamber of Deputies, and opposition parties captured 4 of the 64 Senate seats—the first time that the PRI had failed to hold every seat in the Senate. Capitalizing on the popularity of President Salinas, however, the PRI rebounded in the mid-term congressional elections of 1991, winning 320 seats.

Subsequent changes included the creation of the Federal Electoral Institute in the 1990s and the inclusion of proportional representation and first minority seats in the Senate. The presidential election of 1994 was judged to be the first relatively free election in modern Mexican history. Ernesto Zedillo of the PRI won with 50.2 percent of the vote, against 26.7 percent for Diego Fernández de Cevallos of PAN and 17.1 percent for Cardenas, who this time represented the Party of the Democratic Revolution (PRD). Although the opposition campaign was hurt by the desire of the Mexican electorate for stability, following the assassination of Luis Donaldo Colosio (the intended PRI candidate) and the recent outbreak of hostilities in the state of Chiapas, Zedillo's share of the vote was the lowest official percentage for any PRI presidential candidate up to that time.

In the 1997 mid-term elections, no party held majority in the Chamber of Deputies, and in 2000 the first opposition party president was sworn in office since 1929. Vicente Fox won the election with 43% of the vote, followed by PRI candidate Francisco Labastida with 36%, and Cuauhtémoc Cárdenas of the Party of the Democratic Revolution (PRD) with 17%.

Numerous electoral reforms implemented after 1989 aided in the opening of the Mexican political system, and opposition parties made historic gains in elections at all levels. Many of the current electoral concerns have shifted from outright fraud to campaign fairness issues. During 1995-96 the political parties negotiated constitutional amendments to address these issues. Implementing legislation included major points of consensus that had been worked out with the opposition parties. The thrust of the new laws has public financing predominate over private contributions to political parties, tighter procedures for auditing the political parties, and strengthening the authority and independence of electoral institutions. The court system also was given greatly expanded authority to hear civil rights cases on electoral matters brought by individuals or groups. In short, the extensive reform efforts have "leveled the playing field" for the parties.

The 2006 elections saw the PRI fall to third place behind both the PAN and the PRD. Roberto Madrazo, the presidential candidate, polled only 22.3 percent of the vote, and the party ended up with only 121 seats in the Chamber of Deputies, a loss of more than half of what the party had obtained in 2003, and 38 seats in the Senate, a loss of 22 seats.  Felipe Calderón, a conservative former energy minister, won a narrow victory, and he was elected as the new president. Andrés Manuel López Obrador, lost the very tight race, did not accept the result.

In the 2012 elections, Enrique Peña Nieto was elected as the president of Mexico, meaning the return of PRI after 12 years out of power.

On 1 December 2018, Andrés Manuel López Obrador sworn in as Mexico's first leftist president in seven decades, after winning a landslide victory in July 2018 elections. In June 2021 midterm elections, López Obrador's left-leaning Morena’s coalition lost seats in the lower house of Congress. However, his ruling coalition maintained a simple majority, but López Obrador failed to secure the two-thirds congressional supermajority. The main opposition was a coalition of Mexico’s three traditional parties: the center-right Revolutionary Institutional Party, right-wing National Action Party and leftist Party of the Democratic Revolution.

See also

 State governments of Mexico
 Federal government of Mexico
 Powers of the Union (Mexico)
 Law of Mexico
History of democracy in Mexico

References and notes

Further reading
Bruhn, Kathleen. Taking on Goliath. Penn State University Press 2004.

External links
 Presidency of the United Mexican States
 Chamber of Deputies
Senate of the Republic
 Supreme Court of Justice of the Nation
 Mexican Council for Economic and Social Development
 Mexico Development Gateway
 Official Youtube page

 

bn:মেক্সিকো#রাজনীতি